Berserk and the Band of the Hawk, known in Japan as , is a musou game developed by Omega Force and published by Koei Tecmo for PlayStation 3, PlayStation 4, PlayStation Vita, and Microsoft Windows. It is a collaboration between Koei Tecmo's Dynasty Warriors video game series and Kentaro Miura's Berserk manga series. Berserk and the Band of the Hawk was released for PlayStation 4 and PlayStation Vita, as well as PlayStation 3 in Japan on October 27, 2016, and was released worldwide for Microsoft Windows, PlayStation 4, and PlayStation Vita in February 2017.

Gameplay
Berserk and the Band of the Hawk mixes the hack-and-slash gameplay of Koei Tecmo's Dynasty Warriors series of video games, with the setting and characters from the Berserk manga series by Kentaro Miura.

Plot
The game follows the story of the manga series, starting in the Golden Age Arc and ending in the Hawk of the Millennium Empire Arc.

Development
Berserk and the Band of the Hawk was first revealed in a short promotion video by Koei Tecmo on June 12, 2016, prior to Electronic Entertainment Expo 2016. A release for PlayStation 4, PlayStation Vita, as well as PlayStation 3 in Japan and Microsoft Windows in western territories, were confirmed. A week later, on June 20, a flyer was sent out in Japan, which confirmed a September 21 release in the country. In an interview, producer Hisashi Koinuma ensured fans that the team aims for a CERO D rating for the game in Japan and will do anything to avoid a CERO Z rating. The Z rating is the equivalent of the "Adults Only" rating by the North American board ESRB. On July 15, 2016, Koei Tecmo revealed that the western version of the game was planned to release in Fall 2016. However, when the game's official localized name was revealed, Koei Tecmo announced new release dates, being February 21, 2017 for North America and February 24, 2017 for Europe. On December 1, 2016, Koei Tecmo America revealed its Endless Eclipse Mode, a new detail for battle mechanics and alternative armaments.

In Japan, first-print copies of the game included a bathing outfit for Casca for in the game.

In North America, pre-ordered copies of the game would include codes for DLC costumes. The game supports PS4 Pro which targets 60fps in 1080p

Reception

Berserk and the Band of the Hawk received "mixed or average" reviews, according to video game review aggregator Metacritic.

Destructoid awarded it a score of 8 out of 10, saying "Seeing the story continue past the Golden Age is enough for an enthusiast to buy in. Otherwise, wait for the price to match what's being offered." Famitsu four reviewers gave it scores of 9, 9, 9 and 8 out of ten, equalling a total of 35/40. GameSpot awarded it a score of 5 out of 10, praising its story mode but criticising its secondary modes. IGN awarded a score of 6.3 out of 10, saying "Berserk fits the Dynasty Warriors mold well in Band of the Hawk, but the too-easy combat still gets very repetitive."

Sales
The PlayStation 4 version has sold 32,751 copies in Japan while the Windows version has sold 24,904 copies.

References

External links
Official website

2016 video games
Action video games
Berserk (manga)
Crossover video games
Crowd-combat fighting games
Dark fantasy video games
Hack and slash games
Koei Tecmo games
PlayStation 3 games
PlayStation 4 games
PlayStation 4 Pro enhanced games
PlayStation Vita games
Single-player video games
Theft in fiction
Video games about demons
Video games based on anime and manga
Video games developed in Japan
Video games with downloadable content
Warriors (video game series)
Windows games
Omega Force games